Ed Stinson (born February 15, 1990) is a former American football defensive end. He was drafted by the Arizona Cardinals in the fifth round of the 2014 NFL Draft. He played college football at Alabama.

College career
Stinson was a member of Alabama's 2009 national championship team during his redshirt year as a freshman, played as a backup for the 2011 and starting defensive lineman for the 2012 national championship teams. Stinson was ranked as one of the top defensive end prospects for the 2014 NFL Draft.

College statistics

Professional career

Arizona Cardinals
Stinson was drafted by the Arizona Cardinals in the fifth round, 160th overall, of the 2014 NFL Draft.

On September 2, 2017, Stinson was placed on injured reserve. He was released by the Cardinals on September 12, 2017.

New York Jets
On October 4, 2017, Stinson signed with the New York Jets. He was released by the Jets on October 31, 2017. He was re-signed on November 7, 2017. He was waived/injured on November 11, 2017 and placed on injured reserve.

References

External links
Alabama Crimson Tide bio

1990 births
Living people
People from Homestead, Florida
Sportspeople from Miami-Dade County, Florida
Players of American football from Florida
American football defensive ends
American football defensive tackles
Alabama Crimson Tide football players
Arizona Cardinals players
New York Jets players